Playing hockey games outdoors—in soccer, football and baseball stadiums—is an increasingly popular trend for junior, college, professional and international competitions in the 21st century.  The popularity of outdoor games has resulted in attendance records in several leagues, and the current world record total of 104,173 was set at The Big Chill at the Big House, a December 2010 National Collegiate Athletic Association game between the University of Michigan and Michigan State University.

While other indoor sports such as basketball have been able to use outdoor tennis courts and even aircraft carriers for outdoor games, this is rarely possible in ice hockey because a regulation rink is generally much wider and longer than the playing surface available in either of those venues. Ice hockey, however, has been played at Stade Roland Garros, the venue of the French Open in tennis. Staging a Vysshaya liga game on the Russian aircraft carrier Admiral Kuznetsov has been considered as well. To compensate for the varying weather conditions at outdoor ice hockey games, the teams may switch sides after each half of a period.

History
In the early history of hockey, games were played outdoors on rivers, lakes, and other naturally occurring ice surfaces. In fact, the first indoor game, held in 1875, was a novelty at the time, yet after that the game moved inside. While the first Olympic hockey tournament, held in 1920, was played indoors, games at the first Winter Olympics in 1924 were the first of several such tournaments to be played outdoors. Games at the World Championships were occasionally played outdoors, including the 1957 gold medal game between the Soviet Union and Sweden at the Lenin Stadium in Moscow. The attendance at that game was approximately 55,000, a number that stood as a record for more than 40 years. In 1954, the Detroit Red Wings of the National Hockey League (NHL) played an exhibition game on an outdoor ice surface against the inmates of Michigan's Marquette Branch Prison.

While the New York Rangers and the Los Angeles Kings played an NHL exhibition game in 1991 outside Caesars Palace in Las Vegas, the modern trend for outdoor competition began in 2001. That year, Michigan State University and the University of Michigan played to a 3–3 tie in an outdoor game known as the Cold War before 74,554 fans. The game was held at Michigan State's Spartan Stadium, with the hockey rink set up in the middle of the football field.

The NHL's first regular season outdoor game ensued: the 2003 Heritage Classic, hosted by the Edmonton Oilers, who lost by a 4–3 score to the Montreal Canadiens. The league followed it up in 2008 when it inaugurated the NHL Winter Classic as an annual event to be held on New Year's Day. The 2008 NHL Winter Classic, held in Buffalo, set an NHL attendance record of 71,217. The 2014 NHL Winter Classic, held at Michigan Stadium in Ann Arbor, Michigan, set a new NHL attendance record of 105,491. In 2011, for the first time the NHL hosted two outdoor games, the Winter Classic in Pittsburgh, and the Heritage Classic in Calgary.

Outdoor games have been held by many leagues around the world. The Swiss league's SCL Tigers hosted SC Bern in an outdoor game to celebrate the 100th Tigers–Bern Derby in 2007. In 2009, Swedish clubs Frölunda HC and Färjestads BK played a game at Ullevi. The game broke the former European league-game record for attendance at that time with a crowd of 31,144 (beaten in February 2011 when Jokerit and HIFK played in front of 36,644 spectators). The game also broke the Swedish record crowd of 23,192, set in the same stadium in 1962. The current world record for attendance at a hockey game was set in December 2010, in an NCAA game between the same two teams that participated in the Cold War. In this game, Michigan hosted Michigan State in an event known as The Big Chill at the Big House. The game had an announced attendance of 113,411 spectators, but Guinness World Records certified the attendance as 104,173 based on tickets scanned. The record had previously been set at the opening game of the 2010 IIHF World Championship, in which the hosting Germans defeated the United States 2–1 before a then-record 77,803 fans. Although the game was held at Veltins-Arena in Gelsenkirchen, it was not technically an outdoor game, as the stadium's retractable roof was closed due to International Ice Hockey Federation regulations. In 2010, Färjestad and Frölunda again played an outdoor game against each other, this time in Karlstad. 15,274 spectators saw Färjestad win the game 5–2.

Popularity
Outdoor games have proven to be immensely popular with fans. For the 2003 Heritage Classic, the NHL received over 900,000 requests from all over the world for a chance to buy one of the 57,167 tickets available. CBC's Hockey Night in Canada telecast of the game drew 2.7 million viewers, a record for a regular season game for the half-century old television program. In the United States, the Winter Classics have been a ratings winner; 4.56 million people watched the 2011 Winter Classic, and the game led to a ratings win for NBC in the coveted 18–49 age group despite the fact that poor weather forced the NHL to move the start time of the game back several hours on less than a day's notice. It became the most watched NHL regular season game in the last 36 years. The games have been credited as causing increased interest in hockey in the United States. In Russia, the Kontinental Hockey League (KHL) hosted its first All-Star Game in 2009 in Moscow's Red Square. The league used the location to promote the KHL amidst the global financial crisis.

Games
Though games have been held outdoors since the sport's earliest days, this list contains only those held since the 2001 Cold War popularized the trend of holding outdoor games as events.

See also
List of ice hockey games with highest attendance

Notes
1. The SEL Outdoor Classic was renamed the SHL Outdoor Classic due to the league name change in June 2013.
2. The Rangers are designated as the away team for their outdoor games as a legal fiction; their home arena, Madison Square Garden, receives tax-exempt status, but only if the Rangers do not "cease playing" home games at MSG, generally interpreted as playing any "home" game outside of MSG.

References

External links

History of ice hockey
Ice hockey-related lists